ARSAT-2 is a geostationary communications satellite operated by ARSAT and built by the Argentine company INVAP. It was launched from French Guiana alongside Sky Muster satellite using an Ariane 5ECA rocket on September 30, 2015 at 20:30hs UTC, becoming the 400th satellite to be launched by Arianespace. It is licensed to be located at 81° West longitude geostationary slot. ARSAT-2 is the second geostationary satellite built in Argentina, after ARSAT-1. Structurally and mechanically it is a copy of the ARSAT-1, the only difference being the payload and thus it has different antenna configuration.

Payload
ARSAT-2 payload was supplied by Thales Alenia Space. It consists of both Ku band and C band sections.

The Ku band has 20 physical transponders. Of those, sixteen have a 36 MHz bandwidth and four have 72 MHz. Thus the satellite has a maximum capacity of 864 MHz Ku or 24 transponder equivalent. A  deployable antenna and a  fixed Gregorian antenna.

The C band section has a single  deployable antenna that is fed by six physical transponders. Four have 72Mhz of bandwidth and the other two have 88 MHz. The total available C Band bandwidth is thus 464 MHz (or 12.9 transponder equivalent).

See also

 ARSAT-1
 ARSAT SG-1
 Nahuel 1A

References

External links
 SATÉLITES ARSAT 

Satellites of Argentina
Satellites using the ARSAT bus
Spacecraft launched in 2015
2015 in Argentina